Věnceslav Černý (27 January 1865 in Staré Benátky (part of Benátky nad Jizerou) - 15 April 1936 in Mladá Boleslav) was a Czech illustrator and painter.

First, he studied at the Prague Academy of Fine Arts, later the Academy in Vienna. Alternately lived in Prague, Mladá Boleslav and Železnice. He was almost exclusively devoted to illustrating books (especially adventure books) and magazines (Světozor, Zlatá Praha). A very high percentage of his works are related to historical battle themes and mediaeval civilisation in the form of drawings and large paintings.

He was a popular illustrator of many publishing houses in Prague (e.g. Kvasnička a Hampl, Alois Hynek, Toužimský etc.), and illustrated many books, especially those by Lidia Charskaya, Alois Jirásek, Karl May, Henryk Sienkiewicz. In the years 1893-1909 he illustrated sixteen books of Jules Verne.

See also
List of Czech painters

References

Czech illustrators
1865 births
1936 deaths
Academy of Fine Arts, Prague alumni
19th-century Czech painters
Czech male painters
20th-century Czech painters
People from Benátky nad Jizerou
19th-century Czech male artists
20th-century Czech male artists